Water Works Park is a 1,500 acre park near downtown Des Moines, Iowa. It is one of the largest urban parks in the United States. Located along the Raccoon River, the park offers trails, picnic areas, grills, and fields.

Arboretum
The park is home to the Arie den Boer Arboretum, one of the world's largest collection of crab apple trees, containing approximately 300 varieties. The arboretum was developed under the care of arborist Arie den Boer, in whose honor the arboretum was named in 1961. The Des Moines Water Works staff now maintains through pruning and propagation. Today, the arboretum includes approximately 1,200 trees in the collection.

Events
Every winter, the park hosts Jolly Holiday Lights, a holiday light display. Large portions of the Des Moines Marathon and Hy-Vee Triathlon pass through the park.

The park has frequently hosted large festivals and concerts.

See also
 The Lost Planet (Des Moines)

References

External links
Official Site

Parks in Iowa